Strela (arrow) may refer to:

Russian/Soviet technology

Anti-aircraft missiles
 9K31 Strela-1, a.k.a. SA-9 Gaskin
 9K32 Strela-2, a.k.a. SA-7 Grail
 9K34 Strela-3, a.k.a. SA-14 Gremlin
 9K35 Strela-10, a.k.a. SA-13 Gopher

Other
 Strela (crane), a class of Russian-built cargo cranes used on the Mir and the International Space Station
 Strela (rocket), a Soviet/Russian carrier rocket
 Strela (satellite), a Russian communications satellite constellation
 Strela computer, the first mainframe computer manufactured serially in the Soviet Union

Other uses
 Strela (mountain), in the Plessur Alps, Switzerland
 Strela (beer), a Cape Verdean beer
 Strela candy, a confectionery in the Commonwealth of Independent States